C/2018 C2 (Lemmon) is a hyperbolic comet (previously classified as A/2018 C2, a hyperbolic asteroid). It was first observed on 5 February 2018 by the Mount Lemmon Survey conducted at the Mount Lemmon Observatory near Tucson, Arizona, in the United States. The discovery was announced on 4 March 2018 along with another hyperbolic object, A/2017 U7. Based on the absolute magnitude of 15.1, it may measure several kilometers in diameter. On 22 March 2018 it was determined to be a hyperbolic comet.

Orbit 

While near perihelion, A/2018 C2's heliocentric orbit is not bound to the Solar System, unlike ʻOumuamua, it is not an interstellar object. The heliocentric eccentricity drops below 1 starting with an epoch of January 2023, when it is 13.8 AU from the Sun, making the orbit bound to the Sun before it leaves the planetary region of the Solar System. The more stable barycentric orbit of A/2018 C2, shows that it is only a very distant small Solar System body, approaching as far as 50,000 AU from the Sun, around the distance of the Oort Cloud. It had an orbital period of millions of years until the current approach to the Solar System, where perturbations will shorten the orbit drastically to about 5,200 AU, with an orbital period of 130,000 years. Hui Man-To calculated that the comet would have its next perihelion after 130 to 140 thousands years, at a distance of about 2 AU.

, A/2018 C2 was inbound  from the Sun. A/2018 C2 made closest approach to the Sun on 2 June 2018 at a distance of 1.9 AU (outside the orbit of Mars). Since this object out gassed  generating a cometary coma while near the inner Solar System, it was reclassified as a hyperbolic comet.

Notes

References

External links 
 

Hyperbolic comets
Cometary object articles

Astronomical objects discovered in 2018